Mark Fishman is an American cardiologist, a professor in the Harvard Department of Stem Cell and Regenerative Biology and Chief of the Pathways Clinical Service service at the MGH for patients with complex medical disorders. A researcher and clinician in cardiology, he is the previous president of the Novartis Institutes for BioMedical Research (NIBR), the main research arm of Novartis Pharmaceuticals.

Fishman was appointed president of the newly founded Novartis Institutes for BioMedical Research in 2002 to implement a new strategy in Novartis' global drug discovery effort.  He is the author of over 100 publications and known for pioneering research using the zebrafish as a means of visualizing the development of the circulatory system and as a model for human disease.

Education
B.A. Yale College, 1972
M.D. Harvard Medical School, 1976

Career
He was previously a professor of medicine at Harvard Medical School, chief of cardiology at Massachusetts General Hospital, and director of the Cardiovascular Research Center at Massachusetts General Hospital.  He is a fellow of the National Academy of Arts and Sciences and a member of the National Academy of Sciences, Institute of Medicine.

After being the head of Novartis for 13 years, he decided to retire in 2016  and became professor at Harvard and Chief at MGH

References

External links
 Novartis Institutes for BioMedical Research Official Homepage
 Novartis Institutes for BioMedical Research Official Homepage
 Mark Fishman on changing the grammar of drug discovery 

Living people
American medical researchers
American cardiologists
Businesspeople in the pharmaceutical industry
American business executives
Year of birth missing (living people)
Yale College alumni
Harvard Medical School alumni
Harvard Medical School faculty
Fellows of the American College of Cardiology
Members of the National Academy of Medicine